Bob Lacourse (14 December 1926 – 31 January 2013) was a Canadian cyclist. He competed in the sprint event at the 1948 Summer Olympics.

References

1926 births
2013 deaths
Canadian male cyclists
Olympic cyclists of Canada
Cyclists at the 1948 Summer Olympics
Cyclists from Montreal